North Stoneham is a settlement and ecclesiastical parish located in between Eastleigh and Southampton in south Hampshire, England. It was formerly an ancient estate and manor. Until the nineteenth century, it was a rural community comprising a number of scattered hamlets, including Middle Stoneham, North End, and Bassett Green, and characterised by large areas of woodland. The former 1,000-acre North Stoneham Park  was redesigned by Capability Brown in the eighteenth century, and was one of the largest ornamental parklands in Hampshire.

History

For some centuries, the Willis Fleming family of North Stoneham Park were lords of the manor of North Stoneham, ( Eastleigh) and the principal landowners in the parish.  The estate was purchased by Sir Thomas Fleming in 1599 from Henry Wriothesley, a young Earl of Southampton who inherited the title and estate at the age of eight. The church of St. Nicolas stands in Stoneham Lane, on the edge of the former park, while opposite is the former rectory, now an office complex.

The aviation pioneer, Edwin Moon, selected the flat field at North Stoneham Farm for his first flight in 1910, on what is now Southampton Airport. 

The Stoneham War Shrine was built in 1917–18 in memory of thirty-six local men killed in World War I. The Shrine was restored in 2011.

North Stoneham and neighbouring  South Stoneham are together sometimes referred to as 'the Stonehams' but are situated in different modern-day local authority areas: North Stoneham is in the Borough of Eastleigh and South Stoneham is in the city of Southampton.

Development plans
In the early 1990s, Southampton Football Club considered building a 25,000-seat stadium in the area to replace their stadium in the city, The Dell. However, by 1999 the plan had been abandoned in favour of a 32,000-seat stadium, St Mary's in the St Mary's area of Southampton, which opened in 2001. Following consultation with residents across the borough, North Stoneham was chosen as the preferred site for a new housing development, plans for which were put to the council in 2015. As well as 1,100 new homes, the plans for the £70m scheme include a new primary school, nursery, community centre, care home, shops and play facilities, to be built on a 62-hectare area of the former North Stoneham Park estate, which was landscaped by Lancelot "Capability" Brown.

References

External links

 The Fleming Estate in Hampshire and the Isle of Wight.
 The Restoration of Stoneham War Shrine.
 Currie, C. K. (1992). North Stoneham Park: its origin and development. Retrieved on 2009-02-07. 
 The Willis Fleming Historical Trust
 North Stoneham Park
 North Stoneham House
 The Parish of North Stoneham with Bassett
 

Villages in Hampshire
Borough of Eastleigh